Athetis tenuis is a moth of the  family Noctuidae. It is known from all of Australia, including Norfolk Island as well as New Zealand.

The wingspan is about 25 mm. Adults have speckled pale brown forewings, each with a black or white spot near the middle. The hindwings are mostly white with brown veins.

The larvae have been recorded feeding on the stems of young Gossypium species.

Taxonomy
Athetix tenuis was first described by Arthur Gardiner Butler in 1886 as Radinogoes tenuis from specimens collected at Peak Downs and Rockhampton in Queensland.

References

Acronictinae
Moths of New Zealand
Moths of Australia